Kirby High School is an accredited public high school located in the rural community of Kirby, Arkansas, United States. The school provides comprehensive secondary education for more than 200 students each year in grades 7 through 12. It is one of three public high schools in Pike County, Arkansas and the only high school administered by the Kirby School District.

Academics 
Kirby High School is accredited by the Arkansas Department of Education (ADE). The assumed course of study follows the Smart Core curriculum developed by the ADE. Students complete regular (core and elective) and career focus coursework and exams and may take Advanced Placement (AP) courses and exams with the opportunity to receive college credit. Kirby is a member of the Dawson Education Service Cooperative, which provides career and technical education programs for the area's high school students in multiple school districts.

Athletics 
The Kirby High School mascot and athletic emblem are the Trojans with maroon and gray serving as the school colors.

The Kirby Trojans compete in interscholastic activities within the 1A Classification from the 1A-7 West Conference as administered by the Arkansas Activities Association. The Trojans participate in golf (boys/girls), basketball (boys/girls), baseball, and softball.

References

External links 

 

Public high schools in Arkansas
Schools in Pike County, Arkansas